The list of Columbian College of Arts and Sciences people includes notable graduates, professors, and administrators affiliated with the Columbian College of Arts and Sciences of the George Washington University, located in Washington, D.C.

Alumni

Arts

Media, sports and entertainment

Politics

Others

Faculty

Current faculty

Administration 

Paul Wahlbeck - Interim Dean, Columbian College of Arts and Sciences
Eric Arnesen - Vice Dean Faculty and Administration of the Columbian College of Arts and Sciences
Kathryn Newcomer - Director, Columbian College’s Trachtenberg School of Public Policy and Public Administration
Frank Sesno - Director, George Washington University School of Media and Public Affairs
Sanjit Sethi - Director, Corcoran School of the Arts and Design

Faculty 

Sarah Binder - Professor of Political Science, senior fellow at the Brookings Institution and an inductee to the American Academy of Arts and Sciences
Dana Tai Soon Burgess - Professor of dance, cultural ambassador for the U.S. State Department and a renowned choreographer
Chryssa Kouveliotou - Professor of Physics, former NASA senior scientist and a leading expert on gamma-ray bursts
Sarah Wagner - Associate professor of anthropology, recipient of a Guggenheim Fellowship
Gayle Wald - Professor of English, recipient of Guggenheim and National Endowment for the Humanities Fellowships
Andrew Zimmerman - Professor of History and Guggenheim Fellowship recipient

References 

Columbian College of Arts and Sciences